Cyperus viscidulus is a sedge of the family Cyperaceae that is native to north western Australia (found in Western Australia and the Northern Territory).

Description
It blooms between February and August producing yellow-brown flowers. The leaves are usually about as long as the culms and have a flat to very V-shaped cross-section with purple-red to pale coloured sheaths at the base.

Taxonomy
The species was first formally described by the botanist Karen Louise Wilson in 1980 as part of the work Notes on some Australian species of Cyperaceae as published in the journal Telopea. The only synonym is Cyperus sporobolus var. sexflorus but the species is often incorrectly identified as Cyperus carinatus or Cyperus sporobolus. The holotype was collected just north Bow River Station in the Kimberley region of Western Australia in 1955 by M.Lazarides.

Distribution
In Western Australia it is found along streams and creeks and surrounding water holes in the Kimberley region where it grows in sandy alluvial soils often around sandstone. It is also found in western parts of the top end of the Northern Territory.

See also
List of Cyperus species

References

Plants described in 1980
Flora of Western Australia
viscidulus
Taxa named by Karen Louise Wilson
Flora of the Northern Territory